Beckingham or De Beckingham is a surname of English origin, derived from the parishes of the same name in Lincolnshire and Nottinghamshire.

People with the surname include:
Charles Beckingham (1699–1731), English poet and dramatist
Charles Fraser Beckingham, British orientalist
Elias Beckingham (died 1307), English judge
John Beckingham (1510–1566), English politician, MP for Salisbury
Peter Beckingham (born 1949), British diplomat and Governor of the Turks and Caicos Islands
Steven Beckingham (born 1978), English actor
Stuart Beckingham (born 1981), Australian figure skater

People born with the surname but known by other names include:
Anne Dudley (born 1956), musician (Art of Noise) and film score composer, born Anne Beckingham
Simon Pegg (born 1970), English actor, born Simon Beckingham
Bobby Valentino (British musician), born Robert Beckingham

References

English toponymic surnames